The 2004–05 Euro Hockey Tour was the ninth season of the Euro Hockey Tour. The season consisted of three tournaments, the Karjala Tournament, Rosno Cup, and the LG Hockey Games. The top two teams met in the final, and the third and fourth place teams met for the third place game.

Tournaments

Karjala Tournament
Finland won the Karjala Tournament.

Rosno Cup
Russia won the Rosno Cup.

Sweden Hockey Games
Sweden won the Sweden Hockey Games.

Final standings

Final tournament

3rd place

Final

References
Season on hockeyarchives.info

Euro Hockey Tour
2004–05 in European ice hockey
2004–05 in Russian ice hockey
2004–05 in Czech ice hockey
2004–05 in Swedish ice hockey
2004–05 in Finnish ice hockey